Thiago Alves was the defending champion but chose to compete in the 2013 Taroii Open de Tênis instead.
Alex Bogomolov Jr. won the title after defeating Rajeev Ram 2–6, 6–3, 6–1 in the final.

Seeds

Draw

Finals

Top half

Bottom half

References
 Main Draw
 Qualifying Draw

Jalisco Open - Singles
2013 Singles